Paul Considine (born 11 June 1962) is a former Australian rules footballer who played in the Victorian Football League during the 1980s.  He played 7 games for Hawthorn between 1981 and 1985. He was recruited from the Ringwood Football Club.

He now works with his four brothers for the Secon Freight Logistics company, which his father Maurie Considine started in 1969.  Maurie also played football for Hawthorn in the 1950s.

References

External links

Profile at Hawk Headquarters

Living people
1962 births
Australian rules footballers from Victoria (Australia)
Hawthorn Football Club players